The Sanjak of Alexandretta was a sanjak of the Mandate of Syria composed of two qadaas of the former Aleppo Vilayet (Alexandretta and Antioch, now İskenderun and Antakya). It became autonomous under Article 7 of the 1921 Treaty of Ankara: "A special administrative regime shall be established for the district of Alexandretta. The Turkish inhabitants of this district shall enjoy facility for their cultural development. The Turkish language shall have official recognition".

In 1923, Alexandretta was attached to the State of Aleppo, and in 1925, it was attached to the combined State of Syria, with a sort of federal administrative status termed .

The 1936 elections in the sanjak returned two MPs favoring the independence of Syria from France, and this prompted communal riots as well as passionate articles in the Turkish and Syrian press. The sanjak was given autonomy in November 1937 in an arrangement brokered by the League. Under its new statute, the sanjak became 'distinct but not separated' from the French Mandate of Syria on the diplomatic level, linked to both France and Turkey for defence matters.

Population
The province had an ethnic plurality of Turks and Arabs, also including various minorities.

Despite the plurality, Turks were overrepresented in the assembly of the province, constituting more than half of it. The minorities took their oaths in Turkish when they were appointed as a deputy.

1938 voter registration and elections

The allocation of seats in the sanjak assembly was based on the 1938 census held by the French authorities under international supervision: out of 40 seats, 22 were given to the Turks, nine for Alawi, five for Armenians, two for Sunni Arabs, and two for Antiochian Greeks. Based on 29 May 1937 agreement and the 3 July 1938 signings France and Turkiye will co-defence Hatay with 2500 troops for each. According to this agreement, the Turkish military has sent intervention forces from Payas and Hassa. On July 5, Turkish forces entered İskenderun. Turkey also trucked in people who born at Hatay, into İskenderun Sanjak to use rights for registering as citizens and vote.

According to the official registration numbers by July 22, 1938, 57,008 voters in the Sanjak were registered, belonging to the following ethnic groups.
 Turks: 35,847
 Alawites: 11,319
 Armenians: 5,504
 Greek Orthodox: 2,098
 Arabs (Sunni Muslim): 1,845
 Others: 359

40 seats of the sanjak assembly per qadaa were distributed as follows:
 Antakya: 14 Turks, 7 Alawis, 2 Armenians, 2 Sunni Arabs, 1 Greek Orthodox
 İskenderun: 3 Turks, 2 Alawis, 1 Armenian, 1 Greek Orthodox
 Kırıkhan: 5 Turks, 2 Armenians
 Total: 22 Turks, 9 Alawis, 5 Armenians, 2 Sunni Arabs, 2 Greek Orthodox

Despite the voter registration, no elections were held and an approved by Hatay assembly was commissioned by Turkish and French authorities. Tayfur Sökmen who was appointed by Atatürk to lead the transition arrived in Antakya from Dörtyol on August 25, 1938.

Hatay State

On September 2, 1938, the assembly proclaimed the Sanjak of Alexandretta as the Hatay State. The State lasted for one year under joint French and Turkish military supervision. The name Hatay itself was proposed by Atatürk and the government was under Turkish control. The president Tayfur Sökmen was a member of Turkish parliament elected in 1935 (representing Antalya Province) and the prime minister Dr. Abdurrahman Melek, was also elected to the Turkish parliament (representing Gaziantep Province) in 1939 while still holding the prime-ministerial post. On 29 June 1939, following a referendum, the Hatay legislature voted to disestablish the Hatay State and join Turkey.  The Hatay State became the Hatay Province of Turkey in 1939.

References

Further reading
 Khoury, Philip S. Syria and the French Mandate: The Politics of Arab Nationalism, 1920-1945. Princeton: Princeton University Press, 1987.
 Pedersen, Susan. The Guardians: The League of Nations and the Crisis of Empire. Oxford: Oxford University Press, 2015. 
 Sanjian, Avedis K. "Sanjak of Alexandretta (Hatay): A Study of Franco-Turco Relations," Ph.D. dissertation, University of Michigan, Ann Arbor, 1956.
 Shields, Sarah D. Fezzes in the River: Identity Politics and European Diplomacy in the Middle East on the Eve of World War II. Oxford: Oxford University Press, 2011.

French Mandate for Syria and the Lebanon
Syria
States and territories established in 1918
States and territories disestablished in 1938
Turkish irredentism